Here is a discography of works by Bruce Hornsby. Hornsby released albums with his backing group The Range in his early years, and from 2002 onward with The Noisemakers. He has also released solo albums, as well as collaborations with other artists.

Studio albums

with The Range

Solo work

with The Noisemakers

Other collaborations

 Piano Jazz (2005), Marian McPartland
 Ricky Skaggs & Bruce Hornsby (2007) US (SonyBMG/Legacy), with Ricky Skaggs
 Camp Meeting (2007) with Christian McBride and Jack DeJohnette
 Cluck Ol' Hen (2014), with Ricky Skaggs
 "Voyager One" (2019) with yMusic (single)

Compilations
 Greatest Radio Hits (2003)
 Playlist: The Very Best of Bruce Hornsby (2010)
 The Essential Bruce Hornsby (2015)

Live albums

Live releases
A number of recordings of live shows have been made available:

Dagle's Choice 
 Dagle's Choice, Volume 1 (2010)
 Dagle's Choice, Volume 2 (2010)
 Dagle's Choice, Volume 3 (2010)
 Dagle's Choice, Volume 4 (2011)
Bruce Hornsby Live releases

 Britt Pavilion, Jacksonville OR - July 6, 2002
 Red Butte Garden, Salt Lake City UT - July 11, 2002
 State Theatre, Kalamazoo MI - July 21, 2002
 Westbury Music Fair, Westbury NY - July 24, 2002
 South Shore Music Circus, Cohasset MA - July 25, 2002
 Wolf Trap, Vienna VA - July 29, 2002
 Biltmore Estates, Asheville NC - August 2, 2002
 Chastain Park, Atlanta GA - August 3, 2002
 Bloomsbury Theatre, London U.K. - September 13, 2004 (solo)
 Muffathalle, Munich Germany - September 15, 2004 (solo)
 Jazzhouse, Copenhagen Denmark - September 22, 2004 (solo)
 Ovens Auditorium, Charlotte NC - October 9, 2004
 Harbor Center Pavilion, Portsmouth VA - October 15, 2004
 Ridgefield Opera House, Ridgefield CT - October 19, 2004
 State University, Buffalo NY - November 1, 2004
 Orpheum Theatre, Boston MA - November 5, 2004
 Kimmel Center, Philadelphia PA - November 6, 2004
 Moore Theater, Seattle WA - November 19, 2004
 Aladdin Theater, Portland OR - November 20, 2004
 McDonald Theatre, Eugene OR - November 22, 2004
 The Vic, Chicago IL - December 2, 2004
 Orpheum Theatre, Madison WI - December 6, 2004
 Fine Arts Center, Grand Rapids MI - December 12, 2004
 Broward Center for the Performing Arts, Ft. Lauderdale FL - February 11, 2005
 Davis Theater, Montgomery AL - February 16, 2005
 House of Blues, New Orleans LA - February 18, 2005
 Paramount Theatre, Austin TX - February 19, 2005
 House of Blues, Anaheim CA - July 20, 2005
 Stewart Park, Roseburg OR - July 26, 2005
 Woodland Park Zoo, Seattle WA - July 27, 2005
 Oregon Zoo, Portland OR - July 29, 2005
 Red Butte Garden, Salt Lake City UT - July 31, 2005
 Tivoli Theatre, Chattanooga TN - August 18, 2005
 Biltmore Estates, Asheville NC - August 20, 2005
 Mann Center, Philadelphia PA - August 30, 2005
 Meadowbrook Arts Center, Gilford NH - September 2, 2005
 William & Mary Hall, Williamsburg VA - December 3, 2005
 Chateau Ste. Michelle, Woodinville WA - July 15, 2006
 Konocti Harbor Resort, Kelseyville CA - July 19, 2006
 Mountain Winery, Saratoga CA - July 20, 2006
 McGlohon Theater, Charlotte NC - August 13, 2006
 Boarding House Park, Lowell MA - August 26, 2006

DVDs and box sets
 A Night on the Town, Bruce Hornsby (w/ guests), (1990)
 Rockpalast Live, Bruce Hornsby and the Range, (1991)
 Bruce Hornsby & Friends, Performance film, (2004)
 Three Nights on the Town, Bruce Hornsby and the Noise Makers, (2005)
Box set
 Intersections (1985-2005) (2006)  Legacy Recordings

Albums with associated acts

with the Grateful Dead
 Infrared Roses, Grateful Dead, (1991)
 Grayfolded, Grateful Dead / John Oswald, (1994,1995)
 Dick's Picks Volume 9, Grateful Dead, (1997)
 So Many Roads (1965–1995), Grateful Dead, (1999)
 Dick's Picks Volume 17, Grateful Dead, (2000)
 View from the Vault, Volume Two, Grateful Dead, (2001), also released as DVD
 Grateful Dead Download Series Volume 11, Grateful Dead, (2006)
 Road Trips Volume 2 Number 1, Grateful Dead, (2008)
 30 Trips Around the Sun, Grateful Dead, (2015)
 30 Trips Around the Sun: The Definitive Live Story 1965–1995, Grateful Dead, (2015)
 Robert F. Kennedy Stadium, Washington, D.C., July 12 & 13, 1989, Grateful Dead, (2017)
 Giants Stadium 1987, 1989, 1991, Grateful Dead, (2019)
 Saint of Circumstance, Grateful Dead, (2019)

with The Other Ones
 The Strange Remain, The Other Ones, (1999)

Grateful Dead-related album contributions
 Deadicated: A Tribute to the Grateful Dead, Various Artists, (1991)
 The Concert for the Rock and Roll Hall of Fame, Various Artists, (1996)
 Mystery Box, Mickey Hart, (1996)
 Furthur, Various Artists, (1997)
 Furthur More, Various Artists, (1997)
 Furthur Most, Various Artists, (2000)
 Over the Edge and Back, Mickey Hart, (2002)
 Gilford, NH, September 2, 2005, Ratdog, (2005)
 Atlantic City, NJ, September 4, 2005, Ratdog, (2005)
 Pure Jerry: Hampton, Virginia, November 9, 1991, Jerry Garcia Band, (2006)

Singles

Miscellaneous Tracks 

 "Heartbreak Town", from the film Twice Upon a Time (1983)
 "I Can't Make You Love Me", with Bonnie Raitt, from Luck of the Draw (1991)
 "Madman Across the Water" from Two Rooms: Celebrating the Songs of Elton John & Bernie Taupin (1991)
 "Love Me Still", with Chaka Khan, Clockers Original Soundtrack (1995)
 "Shadowlands", from the film Bamboozled (2000)
 "Between Me and You" and "Never Get You Right," with Brandon Flowers, The Desired Effect (2015)

References

Discography
Discographies of American artists
Rock music discographies